The 2007–08 Ohio Bobcats women's basketball team represented Ohio University during the 2007–08 NCAA Division I women's basketball season. The Bobcats, led by second year head coach Sylvia Crawley, played their home games at the Convocation Center in Athens, Ohio as a member of the Mid-American Conference. They finished the season 20–13 and 10–6 in MAC play. Ohio reached the MAC Tournament Final. After the season Crawley left to take the head coaching position at Boston College.

Preseason
The preseason poll was announced by the league office on October 18, 2007. Ohio was picked first in the MAC East.

Preseason women's basketball poll
(First place votes in parenthesis)

East Division
 Ohio

West Division

Preseason All-MAC

Schedule

|-
!colspan=9 style=| Non-conference regular season

|-

|-
!colspan=9 style=| MAC regular season

|-
!colspan=9 style=| MAC Tournament

|-

Awards and honors

All-MAC Awards

References

Ohio
Ohio Bobcats women's basketball seasons
Ohio Bobcats women's basketball
Ohio Bobcats women's basketball